The 2015–16 season is AaB's 33rd consecutive season in the top flight of Danish football, 26th consecutive season in the Danish Superliga, and 130th year in existence as a football club.

Club

Coaching staff 

{| class="wikitable"
!Position
!Staff
|-
|Head Coach|| Lars Søndergaard 
|-
|Assistant coach|| Allan Kuhn (until 15 January 2016) Jacob Friis (from 11 January 2016)
|-
|Development Manager – AaB Fodbold|| Poul Erik Andreasen
|-
|Goalkeeping coach|| Poul Buus
|-
|Team Leader|| Ernst Damborg
|-
|Doctor|| Søren Kaalund
|-
|Physiotherapist|| Morten Skjoldager
|-
|Physical trainer|| Morten Randers Thomsen
|-
|Sports Psychology consultant|| Martin Langagergaard
|-
|U/19 League coach|| Jacob Friis (until 11 January 2016) Anders Damgaard (from 18 January 2016)
|-
|U/17 League coach|| Adam Harell
|-

Other information 

|-

First team squad 

As of 14 August 2015 

Source: AaB Fodbold website

Transfers and loans

In

Summer

Out

Summer

Winter

Loan in

Loan out

Overall transfer activity

Spending 

Summer:  £0

Winter:  £0

Total:  £0

Income 

Summer:  £0

Winter:  £0

Total:  £0

Expenditure 

Summer:  £0

Winter:  £0

Total:  £0

Friendlies

Pre-season

Mid-season

Competitions

Competition record

Danish Superliga

League table

Results summary

Results by round

Matches

Danish Cup 

Notes
Note 1: Due to inadequate stadium security facilities at Lystrup IF's home ground, Lystrup Idrætsanlæg, the match was relocated to Nordjyske Arena, Aalborg.

Statistics

Appearances 

This includes all competitive matches. The list is sorted by shirt number when total appearances are equal.

Goalscorers 

This includes all competitive matches. The list is sorted by shirt number when total goals are equal.

Assists 

This includes all competitive matches. The list is sorted by shirt number when total assists are equal.

Clean sheets 

This includes all competitive matches. The list is sorted by shirt number when total clean sheets are equal.

Disciplinary record 

This includes all competitive matches. The list is sorted by shirt number when total cards are equal.

Summary

Awards

Individual

Team

References 

2015-16
Danish football clubs 2015–16 season